Paul Cottin (5 June 1856 – 22 February 1932) was a French writer, historian and a scientific editor of historical and literary documents.

Biography
He was the son of a Parisian notary and nephew of François Augustin Cottin, state advisor of the Second Empire (whose daughter married Frédéric Masson), he became, in 1881, librarian and curator of the Bibliothèque de l'Arsenal of the Pavillon de l'Arsenal, after José-Maria de Heredia.

In 1895, on the death of its then owner, Édouard Dumont. the so-called Pelletan heart, allegedly that of the boy Louis XVII, was given by Dumont's cousin, Paul Cottin, to Carlos, Duke of Madrid. In 1909, it passed to Jaime, Duke of Madrid, and later to his daughter, the princess Béatrice Massimo, and finally in 1938, to the princess Infanta Maria das Neves of Portugal, legitimist heir to the throne of France.
 
Paul Cottin was the father of Claude de Cambronne and Marie-Thérèse Cottin, future countess Lacroix de Vimeur de Rochambeau. His granddaughter Laurence de Cambronne was the editor-in-chief of Elle magazine and his great-granddaughter Camille Cottin is an actress.

Bibliography

Forewords
 Foreword of Mes Inscripcions. Journal intime de Restif de la Bretonne (1780–1787)
 Foreword of  Jasseron. 2000 ans d'histoire
 Foreword of  Sophie de Monnier et Mirabeau d'après leur correspondance secrète inédite (1775–1789)
 Foreword of  Toulon et les Anglais en 1793, d'après des documents inédits

Reviews
 Revue Rétrospective, publication fondée et dirigée par Paul Cottin de 1884 à 1904

Books
 Mémoires du sergent Bourgogne 1812–1813
 L'Angleterre devant ses alliés 1793–1814
 Manuscrits de la bibliothèque 
 Correspondance – Documents concernant Musset
 Guide des Archives de l'Ain
 Journal Inedit du Duc de Croy, 1718–1784 V1 (introduction d'Emmanuel de Grouchy, 1906)
 Le livre du XXe, catéchisme social et politique, 1er chapitre
 Sophie de Monnier et Mirabeau d'après leur correspondance secrète inédite (1775–1789)
 Toulon et les anglais en 1793 (1897)
 Rapports Inédits du Lieutenant de Police René d'Argenson (1697–1715)
 Un Protégé de Bachaumont : Correspondance Inédite du Marquis d'Éguilles (1745–1748)
 Lorédan Larchey, (1831–1902)
 Positivisme et anarchie – Auguste Comte-Littré-Taine
 Journal inédit de Mme Moitte, femme de Jean Guillaume Moitte, statuaire, membre de l'Académie des beaux-arts, (1805–1807)

Notes

External links
 Arbre généalogique, Geneanet.org

19th-century French historians
1856 births
1932 deaths
20th-century French historians
19th-century French male writers
20th-century French male writers
People from Essonne
French male non-fiction writers